Lourdes Santiago Torres Leon Guerrero (9 November  1923, Merizo - 25 February 2010) was a teacher in Guam. Considered a "premiere educator", she was posthumously inducted into Guam's Educator's Hall of Fame.

Guerrero worked for almost six decades as a school teacher at Maxwell School, Merizo Elementary School, Sinajana Elementary School, Talofofo Elementary School, Santa Rita Elementary School, and John F. Kennedy, George Washington, Oceanview and Simon Sanchez high schools.

References

Guamanian women
1923 births
2010 deaths
American educators
Guamanian schoolteachers